Richard Paul Matsch (June 8, 1930 – May 26, 2019) was an American judge who served as Senior United States district judge of the United States District Court for the District of Colorado.

Education and career
Matsch was born in Burlington, Iowa and graduated from Burlington High School. He earned his Artium Baccalaureus degree from the University of Michigan in 1951, and his Juris Doctor from the University of Michigan Law School in 1953. He was admitted to the Iowa bar in July 1953.

He served in the United States Army from 1953 to 1955, where he performed counterintelligence duties in Korea after hostilities ended. In June 1955, he was a private first class. He was an attorney in private practice in Denver, Colorado from 1956 to 1959. He was an Assistant United States Attorney of the District of Colorado from 1959 to 1961. He was a deputy city attorney of City and County of Denver, Colorado from 1961 to 1963. He was in private practice in Denver from 1963 to 1965. He was a Referee in Bankruptcy for the District of Colorado from 1965 to 1973, and thereafter served as a United States Bankruptcy Judge for the District of Colorado from 1973 to 1974.

Federal judicial service
Matsch was nominated by President Richard Nixon on January 31, 1974, to a seat on the United States District Court for the District of Colorado vacated by Judge Olin Hatfield Chilson. He was confirmed by the United States Senate on March 1, 1974, and received his commission on March 8, 1974. He served as Chief Judge from 1994 to 2000. He assumed senior status on July 1, 2003.

Notable cases
Matsch presided over the trial of Oklahoma City bombing defendants Timothy McVeigh and Terry Nichols.

Matsch was also judge in a lawsuit (Phillips et al. vs. Lucky Gunner) in Denver where Sandy and Lonnie Phillips, whose daughter, Jessica Ghawi, was one of 12 people killed in the 2012 Aurora, Colorado shooting. Matsch dismissed the case and ordered that Sandy and Lonnie Phillips pay $220,000 in legal costs.

References

Sources

Honorable Richard P. Matsch District of Colorado 

"Program Celebrating the Life and Career of US District Judge Richard P. Matsch (1930-2019)"  

1930 births
2019 deaths
20th-century American judges
Judges of the United States District Court for the District of Colorado
United States district court judges appointed by Richard Nixon
University of Michigan Law School alumni
People from Burlington, Iowa
Judges of the United States bankruptcy courts
United States Army soldiers
Assistant United States Attorneys
Military personnel from Iowa
Lawyers from Denver